"Wot's... Uh the Deal?" is a song from Pink Floyd's 1972 album, Obscured by Clouds. The song features multi-tracked vocals by David Gilmour, and lyrics by Roger Waters that describe taking advantage of certain opportunities life gives and how they affect a person later on. The lyric "Flash the readies, Wot's...Uh the Deal" is reported to be a phrase by roadie Chris Adamson.

Live performances
David Gilmour performed it at several shows on his 2006 On an Island tour and it appears on the live DVD and Blu-ray Remember That Night (2007) as well as the vinyl version of his live album Live in Gdansk. It was also made available to download for people who bought the deluxe edition or iTunes edition.

Personnel

Original
David Gilmour – acoustic guitars, lap steel guitar, lead and backing vocals
Richard Wright – piano, Hammond organ
Roger Waters – bass guitar
Nick Mason – drums

David Gilmour 2006 live personnel
David Gilmour – acoustic guitar, lap steel guitar, lead vocals
Richard Wright – piano
Jon Carin – organ, backing vocals
Phil Manzanera – acoustic guitar, backing vocals
Guy Pratt – bass guitar, backing vocals
Steve DiStanislao – drums

References

External links
[ AMG song review]

Pink Floyd songs
1972 songs
Folk rock songs
Songs written by David Gilmour
Songs written by Roger Waters
Song recordings produced by David Gilmour
Song recordings produced by Roger Waters
Song recordings produced by Richard Wright (musician)
Song recordings produced by Nick Mason
David Gilmour songs